Pepease is the second largest town in the Kwahu East District, in the Eastern Region of Ghana.

The town is home to the St Dominic Catholic Senior High School and the Modak Royal Hotel.

Education
Pepease is known for the Saint Dominic Senior Secondary School. The school is a second cycle institution.

The town has a number of associations. Pepease Kyidom Mma Kuo, Pepease Awerekyekye kuo, Pepease Ladies Club, and Pepease Social Club. These are helping to develop the town in projects like construction of hostels for students and providing land for the establishment of the department of Computer Engineering and Faculty of Agriculture for the Presbyterian University College, whose main office is at Abetifi about three kilometres away.
Okwawuman TV which is a media service originates from Kwahu Pepease and serves to education the world through the online portals. Ankobenmedia Networks which is an internet networking organisation also provides educational platforms by developing websites and Mobile Apps.

Economy
The Kwahu Rural Bank has, since 2011, spent US$65 million to finance a number of development projects in its catchment area. Major recent developments include a modern hotel called Modak Royal Hotel, major developments at St Dominic Senior High School, and a visual communications agency (Codgraphics Studio). Appah Farms is an Agricultural Business Entity that trades in Poultry (Chicken & Eggs) Production. Appah Farms has provided employment for more than 40 inhabitants of the Pepease community.

Transport
The town can easily be connected via the main Nkawkaw to Atibie or Obomeng roads. Taxi cabs ply the route but are prone to delays.

The Afram river lies to the south of Pepease, but access is limited.

People related to Pepease
Shirley Frimpong-Manso

References

Pepease education
Pepiasi Explore Other-Resources

External links

Pepease - tixik.com
Kwahu East District

Populated places in the Eastern Region (Ghana)